Meixi Lake Park is a public, urban park in Yuelu District of Changsha, Hunan, China. Meixi Lake Park is bordered by West Fenglin Road on the North, Third Ring Road on the West, Taohualing scenery spot on the South, and West Second Ring Road on the East. It is a multifunctional botanical garden integrating recreation, physical activities, plant species collection and display as well as tourism.

Tourist attractions

The Meixi Lake Park is divided into several scenic areas, including Taohualing scenery spot, Meixi Lake, International Culture and Arts Center, Changsha Children's Playground, Peach Islet, Jieqing Islet, Gingko Park, and Waxberry Park.

Meixi Lake

Jieqing Islet

Peach Islet
The Peach Islet also known as Cultural Islet, is located in the north of Meixi Lake. The name comes from the peach trees which planted on the islet.

International Culture and Arts Center

Tanying Lake
The Tanying Lake is renovated from Hongsi'an Reservoir.

Gingko Park
It serves multiple functions, including recreation, physical activities and tourism.

Waxberry Park
The Waxberry Park takes its name from the park's arbutus. It is bordered by Lusong Road on the West, Xiuchuan Road on the North, and Xiaohe Road on the Southeast.

Chinese Knot Footbridge
The Chinese Knot Footbridge was completed in May 2015, which is a joint design by John van de Water and Jiang Xiaofei. In 2013 it was rated as one of the world's 10 "sexiest" footbridges by CNN for its sinuous design.

Transportation
 Take subway Line 2 to get off at West Meixi Lake station, Luyun Road station, Culture and Arts Center station or East Meixi Lake station.

References

External links

Parks in Hunan
Yuelu District
Tourist attractions in Changsha